Aechmea gigantea is a plant species in the genus Aechmea. This species is endemic to Venezuela.

References

gigantea
Flora of Venezuela
Plants described in 1889
Taxa named by John Gilbert Baker